Uziel is a surname

Uziel may also refer to:
 Uziel (angel)
 Beit Uziel, moshav in Israel